Rose Bud High School is a comprehensive public high school serving the rural, distant town of Rose Bud, Arkansas, United States. Located in White County, Rose Bud High School is the sole high school managed by the Rose Bud School District and serves students in grades seven through twelve.

Curriculum 
The assumed course of study at Rose Bud High School is the Smart Core curriculum developed by the Arkansas Department of Education (ADE).  Students engage in regular and Advanced Placement (AP) coursework and exams to obtain at least 22 units before graduation. Exceptional students have been recognized as National Merit Finalists and participated in Arkansas Governor's School.

Athletics 
The Rose Bud High School mascot is the Rambler with red and white serving as the school colors.

For the 2012–2014 seasons, the Rose Bud Ramblers participate in the state's fifth largest classification (3A) within the combined 3A Region 2 Conference. Competition is primarily sanctioned by the Arkansas Activities Association with the Ramblers competing in baseball, basketball (boys/girls), competitive cheer, cross country, dance, football, golf (boys/girls), softball, girls), track and field, and volleyball.

References

External links 
 

Public high schools in Arkansas
Schools in White County, Arkansas